Local elections were held in the province of Cavite on Monday, May 9, 2022, as part of the 2022 Philippine general election. Voters will select candidates for all local positions: a municipal and city mayor, vice mayor and councilors, as well as members of the Sangguniang Panlalawigan, the governor, vice governor and representatives for the eight districts of Cavite.

Background
Incumbent Jonvic Remulla who was elected in 2019 is seeking a second term as governor of Cavite. Incumbent Tagaytay Councilor Athena Tolentino, daughter of incumbent Cavite 8th district representative Abraham Tolentino and Tagaytay Mayor Agnes Tolentino is being poised by Remulla to be his running mate. The 23-year old Tolentino said that being a woman and a young politician is her advantage in running for Vice Governor. If elected, she will be the first female Vice Governor of the province. Meanwhile, incumbent vice governor Jolo Revilla was elected for a third consecutive term in 2019 and is running as representative of the 1st district of Cavite.

Provincial elections

Governor
Incumbent Jonvic Remulla is running for his second term.

Per City/Municipality

Vice Governor
Incumbent Jolo Revilla is term-limited and is running for representative of the 1st District of Cavite. Incumbent Tagaytay City councilor Athena Bryana Tolentino, daughter of incumbent congressman Abraham Tolentino, is the party's nominee.

Per City/Municipality

Provincial Board elections

1st District

|-
| colspan="5" style="background:black;" |

2nd District

3rd District

|-
| colspan="5" style="background:black;" |

4th District

|-
| colspan="5" style="background:black;" |

5th District

|-
| colspan="5" style="background:black;" |

6th District

7th District

|-
| colspan="5" style="background:black;" |

8th District

|-
| colspan="5" style="background:black;" |

Congressional elections

1st District (Northern Cavite)
Incumbent Francis Gerald Abaya is term-limited and is running for mayor of Kawit. His brother, former Kawit Vice Mayor Paul Abaya is his party's nominee. His opponent is incumbent Vice Governor Jolo Revilla.

2nd District (Bacoor)
Incumbent Strike Revilla is running for Mayor of Bacoor, switching places with his sister-in-law, incumbent mayor Lani Mercado-Revilla.

3rd District (Imus)
Incumbent Alex Advincula is term-limited and is running for Mayor of Imus. His son, incumbent councilor AJ Advincula is running in his place.

4th District (Dasmariñas)
Incumbent Elpidio Barzaga, Jr. is running for reelection.

5th District (CarSiGMA District)
Incumbent Dahlia Loyola is running for Mayor of Carmona, switching places with her husband, incumbent Mayor Roy Loyola.

6th District (General Trias)
Incumbent Luis Ferrer IV is term-limited and is running for Mayor of General Trias, switching places with his brother, incumbent Mayor Antonio Ferrer.

7th District (Central Cavite)
Incumbent Jesus Crispin Remulla is running for reelection.

8th District (Southwest Cavite)
Incumbent Abraham Tolentino is term-limited and is running for Mayor of Tagaytay, switching places with his wife, incumbent Mayor Agnes Tolentino. Mayor Tolentino was substituted by her daughter Aniela Tolentino to run for Congress.

City and municipal elections

1st District

Cavite City
Incumbent Mayor Bernardo Paredes is term-limited and is no longer running for any position due to age and health. His coalition nominated his daughter, incumbent city Liga ng mga Barangay president and ex-officio city councilor Apple Paredes. She will be opposed by incumbent vice mayor Denver Chua, incidentally her former brother-in-law.

Incumbent Vice Mayor Denver Chua is running for mayor, hence the position will be an open one. His coalition nominated incumbent city councilor Raleigh Rusit, who will be opposed by another incumbent councilor, former vice mayor Percilito "Penchie" Consigo, who is coveting his old post.

The Paredes-Consigo tandem and their team are notably supported by local supporters of the Lacson-Sotto campaign and that of Robredo-Pangilinan, as well as congressional candidate Paul Abaya.

Kawit

Noveleta

Rosario

2nd District

Bacoor

Incumbent Mayor Lani Mercado-Revilla is running for congresswoman, switching places with her brother-in-law, incumbent congressman Strike Revilla. Both are currently in their second terms.

Incumbent Vice Mayor Karen Sarino-Evaristo is term-limited and is running for Bacoor West district councilor. Her coalition nominated incumbent and three-term Bacoor West District councilor and one-time Imus municipal councilor in the 1990s Rowena Bautista-Mendiola, a sister of Strike and Senator Bong Revilla and Antipolo mayor Andrea Bautista-Ynares.

3rd District

Imus City

Incumbent Mayor Emmanuel "Manny" Maliksi is term-limited. He was initially floated to be the candidate of the Liberal Party-led Team One Imus (since dissolved) for the congressional post of the city's lone district, but gave way to Adrian Advincula of Team AJAA in the regular district congressional race following their unification talks brokered by Senator Panfilo Lacson. Maliksi will instead be running as the first nominee of Buklod Filipino Party-List. As a result, both groups will be fielding term-limited district Representative Alex Advincula as their common mayoralty candidate.

Advincula will be opposed by Anthony Astillero, his perennial opponent since their past congressional matches.

Incumbent Vice Mayor Arnel "Ony" Cantimbuhan is on his second term and was initially floated to be Team One Imus' mayoralty bet, but with the unification of Team One Imus and Team AJAA, he had to ditch the plan and will instead seek to reclaim his old post of provincial board member representing the province's third district. Both groups have endorsed former municipal mayor and vice mayor Homer "Saki" Saquilayan as their common vice mayoralty candidate.

4th District

Dasmariñas

Incumbent vice mayor Rex Mangubat will be challenged by his predecessor, incumbent senior provincial board member Valeriano Encabo. They used to be partymates under the National Unity Party until recently.

5th District

Carmona
Incumbent Roy Loyola is running for congressman, switching places with his wife, incumbent congresswoman Dahlia Loyola. Her opponent is former Vice Mayor Eloisa Tolentino.

General Mariano Alvarez
Incumbent Maricel Echevarria-Torres assumed office upon the resignation of her father, former mayor Walter Echevarria. She is running for her first full three-year term. Her opponents are former councilor Ruel Calix, Ed Custodio, Merlita Fernando, incumbent vice mayor Angela Pacayna, Ricardo Restrivera and former mayor Ona Virata.

Incumbent Angela Pacayna, who assumed the post after Maricel Torres took over as mayor is running for mayor. Her party nominated Bong Sevilla. Her opponents are former vice mayor Percival Cabuhat and Gerry Mojica.

Silang
Incumbent Mayor Corie Poblete is not running. Her sister, former mayor Emilia Lourdes "Omil" Poblete is her party's nominee will face off against incumbent Board Member Atty. Kevin Amutan Anarna.

Incumbent vice mayor Aidel Paul Belamide is running for board member. This will be a three-way fight between former police general and CALABARZON police chief Ted Carranza, incumbent three-term councilors Ronnie "Isang-Bagsak" Doneza and Allan Tolentino.

6th District

General Trias

7th District

Trece Martires City
Incumbent Mayor Gemma Lubigan and is running for reelection. Lubigan will be opposed by former three-term mayor Melandres "Melan" De Sagun, who substituted for his brother Bong De Sagun in this race to bid to reclaim his old seat.

Incumbent Vice Mayor Bobby Montehermoso is also running for re-election. He will face incumbent Cabuco punong barangay Jun "Tatang" Rollo.

Amadeo
Incumbent Mayor Redel John Dionisio, running for a second term, is the only known Cavite mayor who is openly supportive of the presidential bid of Manila Mayor Isko Moreno Domagoso. He will be opposed by incumbent vice mayor and former mayor Conrado Viado.

Incumbent vice mayor Conrado Viado is seeking to get back to the post he inherited in 2017 upon the death of then-elected mayor Albert Ambagan Sr.

Indang

Tanza
Incumbent Mayor Yuri Pacumio is running unopposed for his third and final term. ABC President Arch Angelo "SM" Matro will be his running mate.

This will be the first election in Tanza that no one from the Arayata family is running for any position, whether in the town or province.

8th District

Tagaytay City
Incumbent Agnes Tolentino is term-limited and is initially running for Congresswoman, switching her husband, incumbent congressman Abraham Tolentino. However, she withdrew her candidacy and ran for Vice Mayor substituting incumbent Vice Mayor Reymond Ambion.

Alfonso

Incumbent mayor Randy Salamat, a businessperson and restaurateur who owns Grupo Alegria, a chain of fine dining restaurants in Metro Manila and Singapore, is running for a second term. He will be opposed by incumbent 8th district board member Virgilio Varias, who is seeking to return to his old position.

General Emilio Aguinaldo

Magallanes 
Incumbent mayor Jasmin Maligaya is running for her final term unopposed. This is her first time running unopposed.

Incumbent vice-mayor "Renato Dimapilis" switch places with the incumbent councilor "Jesus Antazo" he is opposed by the barangay captain of Brgy. Bendita 1 "Honorato Limboc" partnering with the incumbent mayor Maligaya.

Jesus Antazo won the vice mayoralty position with just a margin of 190 votes.

Municipal Councilors will be elected by gaining the Top 8 highest votes. They are the one who will make Municipal Ordinances, Laws, and Resolutions.

Incumbent councilors Tafalla and Vidallo are not running for any position.

Maragondon

Mendez-Nuñez

Source:

Naic

Ternate

References

2022 Philippine local elections
Elections in Cavite
May 2022 events in the Philippines
2022 elections in Calabarzon